Martin James Smith (born 6 July 1970) is an English vocalist, guitarist, songwriter, and producer. Smith was the front man of the Christian rock and worship band Delirious?. When Delirious? disbanded in 2009, Smith became a solo artist.

Career
Before becoming a full-time musician, Smith was a sound engineer at ICC studios in Eastbourne.

Along with Stewart Smith (no relation) and Tim Jupp, Smith formed The Cutting Edge in 1992.

In 1995, Smith and his wife were involved in a near-fatal car accident, and during the weeks of his recovery, he decided to become a professional musician. This inspired him to write the song "August 30". In 1996, the band, now known as Delirious?, became a full-time endeavour.  Smith's band, Delirious?, produced some of the most recognised songs in Christian music, including "I Could Sing of Your Love Forever", "History Maker", "My Glorious", "Did You Feel the Mountains Tremble?", "Shout to the North", "Deeper", "Majesty (Here I Am)", and "What a Friend I've Found".  The band announced that they would take a break at the end of 2009 to focus on things close to them. Smith said that he wanted to spend time with his family and devote more time to the CompassionArt project. Headed by Smith and his wife, CompassionArt is an art and International development charity. It released a various artists album in January 2009, with Smith appearing on three tracks. Delirious? later confirmed that they were breaking up permanently after a final concert in November 2009.

In 2012 and 2013, Smith independently released four EPs, titled God's Great Dance Floor: Movements One through Four. Each EP contains new songs, written or co-written by Smith. The title track was co-written with Chris Tomlin, In 2013 he released his first full albums God's Great Dance Floor Step 01 and God's Great Dance Floor Step 02, each containing the songs from the four EPs, plus new tracks.

Smith also collaborated with the other members of Delirious? on the 2007 book I Could Sing of Your Love Forever: Stories, Reflections and Devotions. In 2011, he released his autobiography, Delirious: The Autobiography of Martin Smith.

Personal life
Smith has been married to Anna since 1994. She is sister to Delirious?'s former bass player Jon Thatcher. They have six children.

Discography 

As a solo artist
 1998 – The People's Album (various artists album) – two songs
 1999 – The People's Album 2 (various artists album) – one song
 2002 – Your Love Broke Through (various artists album) – one song
 2012 – God's Great Dance Floor Movement One (EP)
 2012 – God's Great Dance Floor Movement Two (EP)
 2012 – God's Great Dance Floor Movement Three (EP)
 2013 – God's Great Dance Floor Movement Four (EP)
 2013 – God's Great Dance Floor – Step 01 (Album comprising Movement One & Two EPs plus two new songs)
 2013 – God's Great Dance Floor – Step 02 (Album comprising Movement Three & Four EPs, plus three new songs)
 2014 – Back to the Start (compilation album of songs from the God's Great Dance Floor releases)
 2018 – Love Song for a City: Live Worship from Around the Globe released 23 July 2018
 2019 – Iron Lung released 10 May 2019, Integrity
 2020 – Exalt released 6 March 2020, Integrity
 2022 - Dancing in the Fire released 4 February 2022, Gloworks

With Delirious?
 1993 – Cutting Edge 1
 1994 – Cutting Edge 2
 1995 – Cutting Edge 3: Red Tape
 1995 – Cutting Edge Fore
 1996 – Live & In the Can
 1997 – King of Fools
 1998 – d:tour
 1999 – Mezzamorphis
 2000 – Glo
 2000 – Roaring Lambs (various artists album) – one song
 2001 – Audio Lessonover?
 2002 – Deeper
 2002 – Libertad
 2002 – Touch
 2002 – Access:d
 2003 – World Service
 2004 – In the Name of Love: Artists United for Africa (various artists album) – one song
 2005 – The Mission Bell
 2005 - Music Inspired by The Chronicles of Narnia: The Lion, the Witch, and the Wardrobe (various artists album) - one song
 2006 – Now Is the Time – Live at Willow Creek
 2008 – Kingdom of Comfort
 2009 – My Soul Sings
 2010 – Farewell Show – Live in London

With Delirious? and Amy Grant
 1999 – Streams (various artists album) – one song

With Delirious? and Hillsong
 2004 – UP: Unified Praise CD/DVD

With Delirious? and André Valadão
 2008 – Unidos

With Stu Garrard
 1995 – Have You Heard?
 2017 - Beatitudes

With Matt Redman
 1998 – Intimacy – 1 song
 2007 – Beautiful News – 1 song

With Graham Kendrick
 2001 – What Grace – 1 song

With Darlene Zschech
 2003 – Kiss of Heaven – 1 song

With Michael W. Smith
 2004 – Healing Rain – wrote 3 songs

With Taylor Sorenson
 2004 – Exodus (various artists album) – 1 song

With Jars of Clay
 2005 – Redemption Songs – 1 song

With Tim Hughes
 2006 – Holding Nothing Back co-wrote 2 songs
 2011 – Love Shine Through co-wrote 9 songs

With CompassionArt
 2009 – CompassionArt (various artists album) – 3 songs (1 song with Chris Tomlin, Kirk Franklin, Watoto Children's Choir / 1 song with CeCe Winans, Lakewood Choir / 1 song with Steven Curtis Chapman, Watoto Children's Choir)

With Israel Houghton
 2009 – The Power of One – 1 song

With Parachute Band
 2011 – Love Without Measure – 1 song (featured artist on "It's You")

With Jesus Culture
 2012 – Live from New York

 With LZ7
 2016 – Home – 1 song (featured artist on "Stolen Voices")

 With Army of Bones
 2017 – Army of Bones (album)

References

External links
Martinsmith.tv
CompassionArt.tv
Interview with Martin Smith

1970 births
Living people
English Christians
British performers of Christian music
Christian music songwriters
Performers of contemporary worship music
Delirious? members